Nana Mensah (born August 26, 1988) is an American actress, writer, and director known for her roles in 13 Reasons Why, An African City, New Amsterdam, Bonding, and The Chair. Mensah's directorial debut, Queen of Glory, had its festival premiere in 2021, and was released in 2022.

Early life and education 
Nana Afiah Mensah was born in New Haven, Connecticut and raised in the Farmington Valley region. Her parents immigrated from Ghana in the 1970s. Her father is a chemical engineer. She has one brother. She attended the Loomis Chaffee School, a private boarding school. Her high school drama teacher, Brian Kosanovich, encouraged her to pursue acting professionally.

After earning a Bachelor of Arts degree in French and sociology from the University of Pennsylvania, her parents wanted her to attend law school. After working in the legal field, she moved to New York City to become an actress in 2009. To support herself, she worked in restaurants, retail, administration, and childcare. She trained at the now-defunct Actors Center, the Shakespeare Lab, at the Public Theater, and LAByrinth Theater Company Master Class.

Career 
In 2009, Mensah played Leslie in The Film You Did Not See. She spent the next few years landing roles in short films like 2010 comedy Behold the Swelling Scene, 2012 comedy Alternate Sides, and the 2013 biographical drama Daadi.

In 2014, Mensah played Sade, Nigerian-Ghanaian expat in An African City. The web series created by Nicole Amarteifio was dubbed "Africa's answer to Sex and the City". She reprised the role for season two.

Mensah has starred in various off-Broadway roles including Nollywood Dreams, reprising the role of Dede in after the production shut down due to COVID-19. Other credits include The Bacchae, Mother Courage and Her Children, Inked Baby, and A Question of Impeachment.

In 2016, she starred as Clare in the Obie Award-winning play, I'll Never Love Again. In 2017 she played Tamyra in Man from Nebraska, for which she earned an Outer Critics Circle Award nomination for Outstanding Featured Actress. In 2020, she co-starred in Farewell Amor as Linda, which premiered at the 2019 Sundance Film Festival's U.S. Dramatic Competition.

In 2021, Mensah premiered Queen of Glory, a film about a Ghanaian-American academic who inherits a Christian bookstore after the passing of her mother. Mensah wrote, directed, and starred in the film which was completed in 30 days, but took over seven years total to complete. She cited Zhang Yimou's Raise the Red Lantern, Wong Kar-wai's In the Mood For Love, films by the Duplass Brothers, Kevin Smith's Clerks, and Lena Dunham's Tiny Furniture as influences. Mensah stated that frustration with limited and stereotypical roles led her to create the film as an artistic outlet: "I wasn't given artistic opportunities anywhere else, so I had to go out and make some." The film was funded through investors, Kickstarter campaigns, and Mensah's own savings.

Queen of Glory premiered at the 2021 Tribeca Film Festival U.S. Narrative Competition. Mensah won Best New Narrative Director and Special Jury Prize for Artistic Expression. In February 2022, the film was acquired by Film Movement with plans for a theatrical and video-on-demand release. The film was nominated for Best First Feature at the 2021 Film Independent Spirit Awards. It won numerous film festival prizes, including two awards from the Champs-Élysées Film Festival and the inaugural California Film Institute's Mind the Gap Creation Prize.

In 2021, The Chair premiered on Netflix, in which Mensah portrays Yasmin "Yaz" McKay, a popular English professor. She was a staff writer on Random Acts of Flyness, Amazon's The Power, and the second season of the Netflix series Bonding. She sold an-hour long drama pilot called Imperium to AMC.

Filmography

Film

Television

References 

Living people
American people of Ghanaian descent
University of Pennsylvania alumni
People from New Haven, Connecticut
Loomis Chaffee School alumni
1984 births